Samuel Macauley Jackson (June 19, 1851 – August 2, 1912) was an American clergyman, editor and author.

Biography
He was born on June 19, 1851 in New York City to George T. Jackson and Letitia J. A. Macauley.

After attending schools in New York, he entered the College of the City of New York in 1865, and graduated in 1870. (He was awarded an A. M. degree from the same institution in 1876.) He spent a year at the Princeton Theological Seminary, then he went to Union Seminary until 1873. He spent two years studying at the University of Leipzig and travelling in Europe and the Orient.

In 1876 he became a Presbyterian pastor in Norwood, New Jersey. He remained until 1880 and spent two years as assistant editor for the Bible Dictionary by Scaff. After resigning his post as pastor, he became an editor of the Schaff-Herzog Encyclopædia of Living Divines. Between 1885 and 1891 he served as author and editor of numerous other works of a theological nature. In 1892 he was awarded a LL. D. from Washington and Lee University, then a D. D. from New York University in 1893. He served as
secretary of the American Society of Church History until 1896, and on charity and prison associations. In 1895 he became Professor of Church History at New York University.

He died on August 2, 1912.

References

External links
 

1851 births
1912 deaths
American Presbyterian ministers